Chuhra is a Dalit caste in India and Pakistan. Populated regions include the Punjab region of India and Pakistan, as well as Uttar Pradesh in India, among other parts of the Indian subcontinent such as southern India. Their traditional occupation is sweeping, a "polluting" occupation that caused them to be considered untouchables in the caste system.

Originally following the Balmiki sect of Hinduism, many Chuhras converted to Sikhism, Islam and Christianity during the colonial era in India. Today, Churas in Indian Punjab are largely followers of Sikhism. A minority continue to follow Christianity, as well as Hinduism, which incorporates elements of Sikhism in its practices. In Pakistani Punjab 90-95% of its Christian population are Dalit Christians of the Chuhra caste; other Chuhras practice Islam or continue to follow Hinduism.

Etymology and history 

The word "Chuhra" is derived from the word "Shudra", one of the varnas in Indian society.

The Bhangis claim descent from Balmiki (also known as Lal Beg or Balashah), a Brahmin who composed the Ramayana and who is worshipped as a Hindu patron saint by the Bhangis. The word Bhangi is derived from Bhanga which means broken. The Bhangi community claims that they were made to sweep the floor and do other menial jobs when they refused to convert into Islam during Mughal era. 

Originally following the Balmiki sect of Hinduism, many Chuhras converted to Sikhism, Islam and Christianity during the colonial era in India.

In 1932 in colonial India, the Balmiki Sabha was created to advocate for the rights of the Chuhras. The Balmiki Sabha was applauded by the Indian National Congress in the mid-1940s for heralding its political message among the Chuhras.

In Pakistan, the word "Chuhra" became a slur directed against poorer people, especially menial workers whose jobs were reserved for Hindus, Christians, and religious minorities. The term later became a slur against religious minorities in general, especially Christians.

By religion

In Hinduism

As with the Lal Begi, the majority of Hindu Chuhras belong to the Balmiki sect of Hinduism. In the Baluchistan Province of colonial India, the majority of Chuhras in the 1931 Indian Census thus recorded themselves as "Hindu Balmiki".

In Christianity

In colonial India, there were waves of conversions to Christianity among the Chuhra and Chamar between the 1870s and 1930s in the Punjab Province and United Provinces of Agra and Oudh. The censuses of British India became increasingly confused regarding Chuhra Dalits' religious beliefs because the respondents were allowed to choose their designation. Jeffrey Cox says that in the 1920s and 1930s they described themselves variously as 

In what is now Pakistan, the conversions to Christianity and consequent invention of a new identity were largely responsible for the name Chuhra becoming archaic. It is often considered pejorative and applied to almost all of the Christians in the country, whom John O'Brien describes as "descended from one tribe-caste of oppressed and excluded people". The status of the Christian Chuhra as Dalit Christians continues to be "distinct feature of social discrimination" against them.

In Islam

Chuhras who converted from Hinduism to Islam were known as Musalis. Despite placing great emphasis on social equality and brotherhood among all Muslims, early South Asian Muslims did not address the problem of untouchability for the Chuhras or Bhangis. As a result, only a very few members from this community ever embraced Islam, most converting to Christianity. Chuhras adopted the externals of Islam by keeping Muslim names, observing Ramadan and burial of the dead. However they never underwent circumcision. Only a few cases of circumcision have ever been recorded for Chuhras or Bhangis and these were Chuhras who lived very near Jama Masjid. The Chuhras did not accept The Holy Prophet Mohammed (Peace be upon Him) as their prophet and also continued observing traditional Hindu festivals, such as Diwali, Rakhi and Holi. Just like their Hindu brethren they continued with their traditional caste work. In India the caste system was fully observed by Muslims. In the same way that Hindu Chuhras who were barred from entrance to temples in historical times. However Muslim chuhras are allowed to go to mosques. Even , Muslim chuhras lead the prayer in mosques and people of other castes follow them.there is no concept of untouchability is observed among Muslims.

In Sikhism
Chuhras who converted from Hinduism to Sikhism became known as Mazhabi Sikhs.

Demographics 
According to the 2001 Census of India, the Balmikis formed 11.2 per cent of the Scheduled Caste population in Punjab and were the second-most populous Scheduled Caste in Delhi National Capital Region. 

The 2011 Census of India for Uttar Pradesh showed the Balmiki population, which was classified as a Scheduled Caste, as 1,319,241.

The Balmikis represent 0.7 per cent in Andhra Pradesh and are mainly concentrated in Anantapur, Kurnool  and Kadapa districts of Andhra Pradesh. They also built a temple of Valmiki in Anantapur, Andhra Pradesh. In Andhra Pradesh they are known as Boya Valmikis or Valmikis.

In the UK, the Council of Valmiki Sabhas UK was established to represent the Balmiki.

Sub-castes 
The following are sub-castes of the Chuhra caste:
Borat
Bhatti
Boya Valmiki
Chhapriband
Dharival
Gill
Hansi
Kandabari
Khosar
Ladhar
Lal Begi
Mattu
Muslim Shaikh
Rahmani
Sahotra/Sotra
Sindhu
Untwal
Valmikis

Use as an epithet 
"Chuhra-Chamar" is a locution used derisively by some members of the Jat caste to refer to both Dalit castes, the Chuhra and Chamar.

See also 
Mazhabi Sikh
Valmiki
Chamar
Dalit theology

References

Further reading

Social groups of Pakistan
Social groups of India
Dalit Christian communities
Punjabi tribes
Christian communities of Pakistan
Dalit communities
Scheduled Castes of Delhi
Scheduled Castes of Haryana
Scheduled Castes of Andhra Pradesh
Scheduled Castes of Jammu and Kashmir
Scheduled Castes of Gujarat
Scheduled Castes of Daman and Diu
Scheduled Castes of Chhattisgarh
Scheduled Castes of Uttar Pradesh
Scheduled Castes of Assam
Scheduled Castes of Kerala
Scheduled Castes of Uttarakhand
Scheduled Castes of Tamil Nadu
Scheduled Castes of Karnataka
Scheduled Castes of Jharkhand
Scheduled Castes of Himachal Pradesh
Scheduled Castes of Punjab
Scheduled Castes of Odisha
Scheduled Castes of Madhya Pradesh
Scheduled Castes of Bihar
Scheduled Castes of Meghalaya
Scheduled Castes of Mizoram